Vavul Mala is a peak in the Western Ghats in the Vellarimala range  of Kerala, India. It is situated at the trijunction of the districts of Malappuram, Kozhikode, and Wayanad in Kerala. Vavulmala resembles a "Camel Hump". Situated at a height of 2,339m, it is the highest peak in the Western Ghats northwards beyond the Nilgiris and also the highest point of Kozhikode district. These compact hills are floristically similar to Nilgiri hills.

The first volume of William Logan's 1887 publication Malabar Manual (the work was later followed up by the Malabar Gazetteer of 1908) refers the 7,677-foot high Vavul Mala as a landmark conspicuous far out to the Arabian sea. 

Vellarimala range is situated in the borders of Malappuram, Kozhikode and Wayanad. It is a high landscape known as "Camel Hump Mountains". It is separated from Nilgiri hills  by Deccan plateau and Chaliyar river valley. It is one of the toughest treks in South India.

References

External  links
Vavulmala in usandeep.com

Mountains of Kerala
Mountains of the Western Ghats
Two-thousanders of Asia